George Hanna (died c. 1962) was the British Communist, who worked in Russia as a translator for the Foreign Languages Publishing House and also Radio Moscow. He was imprisoned by the Stalinist regime, during the 1940s, and after about 10 years in prison was released in 1957. He celebrated his release with a party at the Hotel Astoria in Gorky Street, Moscow. Sam Russell,  Moscow correspondent of the Daily Worker attended the party.

Hanna translated a great deal of the works of Lenin, for example, his revisions of What Is to Be Done? were incorporated into the revised translation included in the English edition of Lenin's Complete Works.

He also wrote:
 Fundamentals of Soviet criminal legislation, the judicial system and criminal court procedure (1960) Moscow: Progress Publishers
 A Short History of the USSR (1963) Moscow: Progress Publishers

References

British translators
British communists
1960s deaths
Year of death uncertain
Year of birth missing
British emigrants to the Soviet Union
Translators from Russian